The Square Peg is a 1959 British war comedy film directed by John Paddy Carstairs and starring Norman Wisdom. Norman Wisdom plays two different characters: a man who digs and repairs roads, and a Nazi general.

Plot
During the Second World War, Norman Pitkin, a roadmender with the St Godric's Borough Council, enjoys annoying the soldiers of the nearby British Army camp, even a general. Despite the efforts of his boss, Borough Engineer Mr Grimsdale, Colonel Layton (the camp commander) has both of them called up for service in the Pioneer Corps to exact retribution. They begin training at the same camp under the supervision of one of Pitkin's former victims, Sergeant Loder. The only bright spot for Pitkin is falling in love at first sight with the beautiful ATS officer Lesley Cartland, who is preparing to go behind enemy lines in Nazi-occupied France.

Pitkin and Grimsdale board the wrong lorry and end up parachuting into France, where they are put to work on road repairs. They inadvertently advance four miles into enemy territory, and Grimsdale is captured and taken to local headquarters in a chateau. Meanwhile, Pitkin (out of uniform) goes to the nearby town of Fleury to purchase sugar and eggs, but does not notice German soldiers standing to attention and saluting him. It transpires that he is looks exactly like the ruthless local commander, General Otto Schreiber. In a cafe, he recognises the waitress as Lesley Cartland. She is working with the local resistance group, but Pitkin inadvertently blows her cover and she is arrested, along with the cafe owner.

Pitkin and Henri Le Blanc, the local resistance leader, break into the chateau through a tunnel that Pitkin digs to try to rescue them, but Henri is himself captured. Pitkin, unaware of this, climbs into Schreiber's suite. When Gretchen, the general's girlfriend (an opera singer of Wagnerian proportions), arrives, Schreiber leaves strict orders not to be disturbed, no matter what. In the next room, Pitkin dresses in one of Schreiber's uniforms and awaits his chance. He watches through a keyhole as the couple dine, then unexpectedly sing a duet. When Schreiber leaves the room to attend to his throat, Pitkin is mistaken for him by Gretchen and has to attempt to sing Schubert lieder with her. Luckily, Schreiber has locked himself in the bathroom. Eventually he gets out, but after some further hijinks, including a rendition of the Marx Brothers' mirror routine from Duck Soup, Pitkin knocks Schreiber out (Gretchen having fainted after seeing two Schreibers). By pretending to be Schreiber, Pitkin manages to free the prisoners. They escape, but Pitkin is caught and sentenced to be shot at dawn. As the execution is about to be carried out, he inadvertently falls into the camouflaged tunnel he dug and escapes. He ties up Schreiber (off-camera).

After the war ends,Schreiber puts on his glasses and Turns  back into Mr Grimsdale and  he is still Borough Engineer, but Pitkin is now the mayor.

Cast
 Norman Wisdom as Norman Pitkin/General Schreiber
 Honor Blackman as Lesley Cartland
 Edward Chapman as Mr. Grimsdale
 Campbell Singer as Sergeant Loder
 Hattie Jacques as Gretchen
 Brian Worth as Henri Le Blanc
 Terence Alexander as Captain Wharton
 John Warwick as Colonel Layton
 Arnold Bell as General Hunt
 André Maranne as Jean-Claude
 Victor Beaumont as Jogenkraut
 Frank Williams as Captain Ford
 Oliver Reed (uncredited)
 Eddie Leslie as Medical Officer

Reception
The popularity of Norman Wisdom films had declined through the 1950s but The Square Peg halted the trend. The film was the 7th most popular movie at the British box office in 1959. According to Kinematograph Weekly the film performed "better than average" at the British box office in 1959.

It also gained a 3.3/5 on Letterboxd according to 123 ratings.

References

External links
 
 
 
 The Square Peg at BFI Screenonline

1959 films
1959 comedy films
British comedy films
Films directed by John Paddy Carstairs
Films shot at Pinewood Studios
Military humor in film
1950s English-language films
1950s British films